Serhiy Oleksandrovych Yesin (born 2 April 1975) is a Ukrainian former footballer and current coach.

Playing career
Yesin was born in Kerch. He took part in the 1992 Vyshcha Liha final playing for Tavriya Simferopol. Since it was his only game of the season, he did not receive the gold medal.

References

External links 
 Official Website Profile
 
 

1975 births
Living people
People from Kerch
Ukrainian footballers
Association football midfielders
Ukraine international footballers
SC Tavriya Simferopol players
FC Metalist Kharkiv players
FC Metalist-2 Kharkiv players
FC Sevastopol players
Navbahor Namangan players
FC Helios Kharkiv players
FC Hoverla Uzhhorod players
SC Beregvidek Berehove players
Ukrainian Premier League players
Ukrainian First League players
Ukrainian Second League players
Ukrainian football managers
FC Helios Kharkiv managers
FC Okean Kerch managers
Ukrainian First League managers
Crimean Premier League managers
Ukrainian expatriate footballers
Expatriate footballers in Uzbekistan
Ukrainian expatriate sportspeople in Uzbekistan